Varin, also called Var, in Iran, may refer to:
 Varin-e Bala
 Varin-e Pain

See also
 Var, Iran